Ape and Super-Ape is a 1972 Dutch documentary film directed by Bert Haanstra. It was nominated for an Academy Award for Best Documentary Feature.

The film is also notable for featuring extensive documentary footage of the life of penguins on Antarctica 33 years before another documentary film, March of the Penguins (2005) focused on the same subject.

Overview
The film is a study of the differences and similarities between human and animal behaviour. The first part of the movie focuses on the behaviour of various animal species. The second half is about the behaviour of humans, often intercutting with footage of animal behaviour. In the original Dutch version writer Anton Koolhaas, who also wrote the script, provided the voice-over.

Haanstra had already shown interest in human and animal behaviour in his previous films, like Zoo (1961). Ape and Super-Ape analyzed these similarities on a much larger scale. In preparation for this documentary Haanstra and his camera crew traveled across the world for three years. They filmed animals and people in many different continents (Africa and Antarctica get extensive attention), while the well known Dutch ethnologist Gerard Baerendts was consulted for scientific advice.

Haanstra would later make two other documentaries about animals: Nationale parken... noodzaak (1978) and Chimps onder elkaar (1984).

References

External links
, posted by the Netherlands Institute for Sound and Vision

1972 films
1972 documentary films
1970s Dutch-language films
Dutch documentary films
Documentary films about nature
Films shot in South Africa
Films set in Antarctica
Documentary films about Africa
Documentary films about Antarctica
Films about apes
Films about penguins
Films set in zoos
Biographical documentary films
Anthropology documentary films
Films directed by Bert Haanstra